Hanibal Lucić or Annibale Lucio (c. 1485 – 14 December 1553) was a Croatian Renaissance poet and playwright, author of the first secular drama in Croatian.

Biography
He was born to a Dalmatian noble family of Antun and Goja in Hvar, where he spent most of his life. Early in his youth, he was a judge and later became a lawyer of the Hvar municipality. As a witness of the Hvar Rebellion in 1510, he was forced to flee to Trogir and Split due to his disparaging stance towards the lower rebel peasantry. He referred to them as "a bunch who have no thought".

His early literary work became associated with the translations of Ovid's work (Croatian:"iz latinske odiće svukavši u našu harvacku priobukal"). His writings are primarily recorded to be written in the Southern Čakavian dialect. He wrote drama (Robinja, the first secular-themed play in history of Croatian literature) and love poetry, under heavy influence of Francesco Petrarca, but the Croatian folklore is also included in his work. His admiration towards the feminine figure plays an important role in most of his poems.

He was prone to self-criticism and had most of his work burned; the rest was salvaged and later published by his son Antonij.

References

External links

Hanibal Lucić, životopis 

1480s births
1553 deaths
16th-century Croatian poets
16th-century male writers
Croatian dramatists and playwrights
16th-century Croatian people
People from Hvar (city)
16th-century Venetian writers
Republic of Venice poets
Venetian Slavs
Croatian male poets